KAMAZ Stadium is a multi-purpose stadium in Naberezhnye Chelny, Russia.  It is currently used mostly for football matches and is the home stadium of FC KAMAZ Naberezhnye Chelny.  The stadium was built in 1977 and after reconstruction in 2016 holds 6,248 people.

External links
Image of KAMAZ Stadium

Buildings and structures completed in 1977
Sports venues built in the Soviet Union
Football venues in Russia
FC KAMAZ Naberezhnye Chelny
Multi-purpose stadiums in Russia
Sports venues completed in 1977
Buildings and structures in Tatarstan